o-Aminophenol oxidase (isophenoxazine synthase, o-aminophenol:O2 oxidoreductase, 2-aminophenol:O2 oxidoreductase, GriF) is an enzyme with systematic name 2-aminophenol:oxygen oxidoreductase. This enzyme catalyses the following chemical reaction

 2 o-aminophenol + O2 + acceptor  2-aminophenoxazin-3-one + reduced acceptor + 2 H2O (overall reaction)
 (1a) 2 2-aminophenol + O2  2 6-iminocyclohexa-2,4-dienone + 2 H2O
 (1b) 2 6-iminocyclohexa-2,4-dienone + acceptor  2-aminophenoxazin-3-one + reduced acceptor (spontaneous)

o-Aminophenol oxidase is a flavoprotein.

References

External links 
 

EC 1.10.3